In atomic physics, the Bohr magneton (symbol ) is a physical constant and the natural unit for expressing the magnetic moment of an electron caused by its orbital or spin angular momentum.
In the SI units, the Bohr magneton is defined as

and in the Gaussian CGS units as

where
 is the elementary charge,
 is the reduced Planck constant,
 is the electron mass,
 is the speed of light.

History
The idea of elementary magnets is due to Walther Ritz (1907) and Pierre Weiss. Already before the Rutherford model of atomic structure, several theorists commented that the magneton should involve the Planck constant h. By postulating that the ratio of electron kinetic energy to orbital frequency should be equal to h, Richard Gans computed a value that was twice as large as the Bohr magneton in September 1911. Langevin assumed that the attractive force was inversely proportional to distance to the power  and specifically 

The Romanian physicist Ștefan Procopiu had obtained the expression for the magnetic moment of the electron in 1911.  The value is sometimes referred to as the "Bohr–Procopiu magneton" in Romanian scientific literature. The Weiss magneton was experimentally derived in 1911 as a unit of magnetic moment equal to  joules per tesla, which is about 20% of the Bohr magneton.

In the summer of 1913, the values for the natural units of atomic angular momentum and magnetic moment were obtained by the Danish physicist Niels Bohr as a consequence of his atom model.   In 1920, Wolfgang Pauli gave the Bohr magneton its name in an article where he contrasted it with the magneton of the experimentalists which he called the Weiss magneton.

Theory
A magnetic moment of an electron in an atom is composed of two components.  First, a moving electric charge of the electron forms a current, hence the orbital motion of an electron around a nucleus generates a magnetic moment by Ampère's circuital law. Second, the inherent rotation, or spin, of the electron has a spin magnetic moment.

In the Bohr model of the atom, for an electron that is in the orbit of lowest energy, its orbital angular momentum has magnitude equal to the reduced Planck constant, denoted ħ.  The Bohr magneton is the magnitude of the magnetic dipole moment of an electron orbiting an atom with this angular momentum.

The spin angular momentum of an electron is ħ, but the intrinsic electron magnetic moment caused by its spin is also approximately one Bohr magneton, which results in the electron spin g-factor, a factor relating spin angular momentum to corresponding magnetic moment of a particle, being approximately two.

See also
 Anomalous magnetic moment
 Electron magnetic moment
 Bohr radius
 Nuclear magneton
 Parson magneton
 Physical constant
 Zeeman effect

References

Atomic physics
Niels Bohr
Physical constants
Quantum magnetism
Magnetic moment